Chandpur Assembly constituency is one of the 403 constituencies of the Uttar Pradesh Legislative Assembly, India. It is a part of the Bijnor district and one of the five assembly constituencies in the Bijnor Lok Sabha constituency. First election in this assembly constituency was held in 1957 after the delimitation order (DPACO – 1956) was passed in 1956. The constituency was assigned identification number 23 after "Delimitation of Parliamentary and Assembly Constituencies Order, 2008" was passed in the year 2008.

Wards / Areas
Extent of Chandpur Assembly constituency is KCs Chandpur, Basta, PCs Aurangabad, Azamgarh Urf Ratangarh, Azampur, Dharupur, Dhundli, Govli, Heempur Bujurg, Jujhaila, Majhaula Gujar, Murahat, Phoona, Yusufa of Phoona KC & Chandpur MB of Chandpur Tehsil.

Members of the Legislative Assembly

Election results

2022

2017

2012
16th Vidhan Sabha: 2012 General Elections

Source:

See also

Bijnor Lok Sabha constituency
Bijnor district
Government of Uttar Pradesh
List of Vidhan Sabha constituencies of Uttar Pradesh
Sixteenth Legislative Assembly of Uttar Pradesh
Uttar Pradesh Legislative Assembly
Uttar Pradesh

References

External links
 

Assembly constituencies of Uttar Pradesh
Politics of Bijnor district
Constituencies established in 1956
1956 establishments in Uttar Pradesh